Fannia rondanii  is a species of fly in the family Fanniidae. It is found in the  Palearctic.  For identification see

References

External links
Images representing Fannia rondanii at BOLD

Fanniidae
Insects described in 1893
Muscomorph flies of Europe